Patterns of Sexual Behavior is a 1951 book by anthropologist Clellan S. Ford and ethologist Frank A. Beach, in which the authors integrate information about human sexual behavior from different cultures, and include detailed comparisons across animal species, with particular emphasis on primates. The book received positive reviews and has been called a classic. It provided the foundation for the later research of Masters and Johnson.

Summary
Ford and Beach employ a "cross-cultural correlational method" in exploring sexual behavior, a statistical approach suitable for distinguishing behavioral trends and making generalizations. They integrate information from 191 cultures: 48 from Oceania, 28 from Eurasia, 33 from Africa, 57 from North America, and 26 from South America. Much of their data was collected in the Human Relations Area Files, a cross-institutional organization co-founded by Ford. They offer information on such topics as "sexual positions, length (time) of intercourse, locations for intercourse, orgasm experiences, types of foreplay, courting behaviors, frequencies of intercourse [and] methods of attracting a partner." They cover homosexuality in both humans and other animals, citing evidence of accepted homosexual behavior in 49 of the 76 cultures for which the relevant data were available. Ford and Beach conclude that there is a "basic mammalian capacity" for same-sex behavior.

Publication history
Patterns of Sexual Behavior was originally published by Harper & Brothers, New York in 1951. The following year, the work was reprinted (under the title Patterns of Sexual Behaviour) by Eyre and Spottiswoode in London. Metheun published a reprint of the 1951 Harper & Row edition in 1965.

Reception

Scientific and academic journals
Patterns of Sexual Behavior received positive reviews from Allan R. Holmberg in the American Sociological Review and Abraham Stone in Marriage and Family Living, and was later discussed by the anthropologist George Murdock in American Anthropologist.

Holmberg described the book as well-written, and credited Ford and Beach with placing "the study of sex in a broad scientific perspective" by presenting and analyzing "an enormous body of data" on sexual behavior in both humans and non-human animals and placing it in cross-cultural, evolutionary, and physiological perspectives. He described their efforts as having "important theoretical, methodological, and practical implications" and believed they showed the merits of a "cross-disciplinary approach to the problems of human behavior." He complimented them for statistically documenting sexual practices and attitudes, and contributing important material on masturbation and homosexuality, suggesting the existence of "an inherent biological tendency toward such activities." He believed their book deserved to be widely read and predicted that it would have a "healthy impact on attitudes toward sex" and encourage further research by social scientists. However, he criticized them for providing insufficient discussion of "the symbolic aspects of sexual behavior".

Stone credited Ford and Beach with examining both biological and social influences on sex, thereby providing an "essential perspective" on human sexual behavior. Though he considered their use of the term "sex behavior" to refer exclusively to "behavior involving stimulation and excitation of the sexual organ" to be narrow, he believed they dealt "in great detail with a great many aspects of sex conduct and sex contact" and provided a "very full presentation of sex behavior from the point of view of anatomy and physiology".

Murdock described the book as a "classic" of its field.

Evaluations in books
Anne Bolin and Patricia Whelehan identified Patterns of Sexual Behavior as a book that was highly influential in the study of sexual behavior in Perspectives on Human Sexuality (1999). They wrote that it provided the intellectual foundation for the later research of Masters and Johnson. Andrew Paul Lyons and Harriet Lyons argued Irregular Connections: A History of Anthropology and Sexuality (2004) that Patterns of Sexual Behavior was comprehensive for its time but nevertheless contained a number of self-imposed limitations. Its authors limited their definition of sexual behavior to "behavior involving stimulation and excitation of the sexual organs," and made no attempt to explore sexual symbolism. While acknowledging that their study might have implications for psychology and psychoanalysis, they felt themselves unqualified to explore specific questions pertaining to this field. They claimed to make no judgements of moral value, though their study is considered supportive of sexual relativism. Lyons and Lyons credited them with "making homosexual behavior more visible and more acceptable within the culture of its time."

The anthropologist Peter B. Gray and Justin R. Garcia described Patterns of Sexual Behavior as similar to their work Evolution and Human Sexual Behavior (2013) in its objectives; however, they also considered it dated.

References

1951 non-fiction books
Biology books
English-language books
Harper & Brothers books
Non-fiction books about sexuality
Works about animal sexuality
1951 in biology